The United Provinces of Central Italy, also known as the Confederation of Central Italy or General Government of Central Italy, was a short-lived military government established by the Kingdom of Piedmont-Sardinia. It was formed by a union of the former Grand Duchy of Tuscany, Duchy of Parma, Duchy of Modena, and the Papal Legations, after the Second Italian War of Independence.

After August 1859, the pro-Piedmontese regimes of Tuscany, Parma, Modena and the Papal Legations agreed to several military treaties. On 7 November 1859, they elected Eugenio Emanuele di Savoia-Carignano as their regent. However, King Victor Emmanuel II of Savoy, who was allied to France which claimed a counterpart, refused to endorse the election, and sent Carlo Bon Compagni instead as the Governor General of Central Italy, who was responsible for the diplomatic and military affairs of the states.

On 8 December 1859, Parma, Modena and the Papal Legations were incorporated into the Royal Provinces of Emilia. After plebiscites were held during March 1860, and France was granted Nice and Savoy, the territory was annexed formally to Piedmont-Sardinia, as Bon Compagni resigned on 3 March 1860.

See also
Italian Unification
Grand Duchy of Tuscany
Duchy of Parma
Duchy of Modena and Reggio
Victor Emmanuel II, King of Sardinia
List of historical states of Italy
Former countries in Europe after 1815

References
States and Regents of the World

States and territories disestablished in 1860
Italian unification
States and territories established in 1859
Italian states
1859 establishments in Italy
1860 in Italy